Sir Thomas Stradling (by 1495 – 27 January 1571), of St Donats, near Llantwit Major was a Welsh politician.

Family
He was the son of Sir Edward Stradling by his wife, Elizabeth Arundell. One of his sisters, Jane, married John Popham. He himself married Catherine Gamage, and they had two sons, both MPs, David and Edward, and five daughters.

Career
He was a Member (MP) of the Parliament of England for East Grinstead in 1553 and Arundel in 1554.

References

15th-century births
1571 deaths
16th-century Welsh politicians
English knights
English MPs 1553 (Mary I)
English MPs 1554
People from Glamorgan